Serei Sophorn River is a river that flows through Banteay Meanchey province in Cambodia. It is a major tributary of the Tonlé Sap.

References

Rivers of Cambodia
Tonlé Sap